Magda Hagstotz (1914–2001) was a German painter and belonging to the post-war abstract art movement. Her works consist mainly of watercolors and elaborately textured surfaces on small and medium canvases.

Early life and education 
Hagstotz was born in Stuttgart and was influenced by the theories of the Stuttgarter Schule and by contemporary artists such as Ida Kerkovius, Max Ackermann, Willi Baumeister, Oskar Schlemmer, Adolf Hölzel and :de:Alfred Lörcher. She attended the Würtembergischen Staatlichen Kunstgewerbeschule from 1930 to 1933 and the Reimannschule Berlin in 1932. She studied in London and elsewhere from 1934 to 1937, then at the Kunstakademie Stuttgart from 1938 to 1943. She studied the nude form and composition under G. Biese from 1943 to 1945.

Career

From 1941 until 1962, she was chief designer of textiles for a colored-leather manufacturer, Pfennig u. Co.; Ludwigsburg. She also engaged in independent artistic activity from 1941 onwards.

She was awarded a gold medal at the Milano Triennial.

Works 

A private collector in Bruges, Belgium, maintains an inventory of 27 Hagstotz works. These works span the 1950s to 1980s, and consist primarily of mixed media:
 
 Hinein, 1970s, unsigned (ref. 298a)
 Nachteule, 1970s, unsigned (ref. 298b)
 Grenze, 1970s, unsigned (ref. 298c)
 Zeuge, 1970s, unsigned (ref. 298d)
 Die Wiese, 1970s, unsigned (ref. 298e)
 Nachtgespinst, 1977, signed, dated (ref. 298f)
 Versprechung, 1980s, signed (ref. 298g)
 Engel der Nacht, 1967, signed (ref. 298h)
 Pax Romana, 1960s, signed (ref. 298i)
 Zwiespalt, 1960s, signed (ref. 298j)
 Schaltung, 1970s, signed (ref. 298k)
 Spur, 1990, signed (ref. 298l)
 Bezauberung, 1960s, signed, stamped (ref. 298m)
 Spiegelung, 1960s, unsigned, stamped (ref. 298n)
 Spiel, 1950s, unsigned, stamped (ref. 298o)
 Erlösung, date unknown, signed (ref. 298p)
 Zeug, date unknown, unsigned (ref. 298q)
 Strömung, date unknown, unsigned (ref. 298r)
 Sehnsucht, 1977, signed, dated (Reference 298s)
 Die Vereinbarung, date unknown, unsigned (ref. 298t)
 Dissonanz, date unknown, signed (ref. 298u)
 Ritus, date unknown, unsigned, stamped (ref. 298v)
 Florae 1, date unknown, unsigned, stamped (ref. 298x)
 Florae 2, date unknown, signed, stamped (ref. 298y)
 Florae 3, 1966, signed, dated (ref. 298z)
 Florae 4, 1965, signed, dated (ref. 298za)
 Selbstporträt mit gewalzte Tusche 1972, signed, dated (ref. 298zb)

References

Bibliography 
 Schlegel, Hans K and Paul Sviridoff. Die Malerin Magda Hagstotz, Verlag Paul Sviridoff, Schwäbisch Hall, 1984 
 Bütow, Kurt. Europäisches Künstlerlexikon, Malerei und Zeichenkunst, Bavaria Kunstverlag.
 Nagel, Gert K. Schwäbisches Künstlerlexikon vom Barock bis zur Gegenwart, Verlag Kunst & Antiquitäten – München.

20th-century German painters
1914 births
2001 deaths
20th-century German women artists
German women painters